Brandon is an unincorporated community in Knox County, in the U.S. state of Ohio.

History
Brandon was originally called Four Corners, then Hildreth, but the site was never legally platted on account of a land dispute in the 1840s. A post office was first established there under the name Hildreths in 1839. The post office's name was changed to Brandon in 1848, and remained in operation until 1902.

References

Unincorporated communities in Knox County, Ohio
1839 establishments in Ohio
Populated places established in 1839
Unincorporated communities in Ohio